Glenasmole is a valley in the Dublin Mountains in the south of County Dublin, Ireland. The River Dodder rises at Kippure and flows through the valley, reaching the sea at Dublin Bay. The Glenasmole Valley is an EU-designated Special Area of Conservation.

The Dodder feeds the two reservoirs at the centre of the valley, known as the Bohernabreena Reservoirs. The reservoirs, constructed between 1883 and 1887, supply 18.2 million litres of water per day. Despite being within South Dublin's local authority area, the reservoirs and accompanying waterworks are owned and operated by Dublin City Council.

The area around the valley is rural in nature and has a population of 415 according to the 2016 Census. There are no nucleated villages in the valley as most dwellings are one-off houses.

References

Landforms of County Dublin
Valleys of Ireland